Al-Faw District may refer to the following places:

 Al-Faw District, Basra Governorate, a district in the Basra Governorate in Iraq
 Al Faw District, Al Qadarif, a district in the state of Al Qadarif in Sudan